In fluid mechanics and astrophysics, the relativistic Euler equations are a generalization of the Euler equations that account for the effects of general relativity. They have applications in high-energy astrophysics and numerical relativity, where they are commonly used for describing phenomena such as gamma-ray bursts, accretion phenomena, and neutron stars, often with the addition of a magnetic field. Note: for consistency with the literature, this article makes use of natural units, namely the speed of light  and the Einstein summation convention.

Motivation 
For most fluids observable on Earth, traditional fluid mechanics based on Newtonian mechanics is sufficient. However, as the fluid velocity approaches the speed of light or moves through strong gravitational fields, or the pressure approaches the energy density, these equations are no longer valid. Such situations occur frequently in astrophysical applications. For example, gamma-ray bursts often feature speeds only  less than the speed of light, and neutron stars feature gravitational fields that are more than  times stronger than the Earth's. Under these extreme circumstances, only a relativistic treatment of fluids will suffice.

Introduction 
The equations of motion are contained in the continuity equation of the stress–energy tensor :

where  is the covariant derivative. For a perfect fluid,

To the above equations, a statement of conservation is usually added, usually conservation of baryon number. If  is the number density of baryons this may be stated

These equations reduce to the classical Euler equations if the fluid three-velocity is much less than the speed of light, the pressure is much less than the energy density, and the latter is dominated by the rest mass density. To close this system, an equation of state, such as an ideal gas or a Fermi gas, is also added.

Equations of Motion in Flat Space

Where  is the energy density of the system, with  being the pressure, and  being the four-velocity of the system.

Expanding out the sums and equations, we have, (using  as the material derivative)

Then, picking  to observe the behavior of the velocity itself, we see that the equations of motion become

Note that taking the non-relativistic limit, we have . This says that the energy of the fluid is dominated by its rest energy.

Derivation of the Equations of Motion
In order to determine the equations of motion, we take advantage of the following spatial projection tensor condition:

Upon doing this, and noting that , we have . Relabeling the indices  as  shows that the two completely cancel. This cancellation is the expected result of contracting a temporal tensor with a spatial tensor.

Now, when we note that

Where we have implicitly defined that .

We can calculate that
 

And thus

Note that the second identity follows from the first. Under these simplifications, we find that

We have two cancellations, and are thus left with

See also
 Relativistic heat conduction
 Equation of state (cosmology)

References

Special relativity
Equations of fluid dynamics